The Garras International Antinarcotics Training School (Escuela Garras del Valor) is a military training facility located in Bolivia, which trains military and law enforcement personnel from Bolivia and other Latin American countries in counternarcotics, intelligence, and counterinsurgency techniques.

See also
 Plan Colombia
 War on Drugs
 School of the Americas

References

Military of Bolivia
Law enforcement in Bolivia